Mahazoarivo is a town and commune in Madagascar. It belongs to the district of Vohipeno, which is a part of Vatovavy-Fitovinany Region. The population of the commune was estimated to be approximately 19,000 in 2001 commune census.

Only primary schooling is available. The majority 90% of the population of the commune are farmers.  The most important crops are rice and beans, while other important agricultural products are pineapple, bananas and coffee. Services provide employment for 10% of the population.

References and notes 

Populated places in Vatovavy-Fitovinany